Kootathil Oruthan is a 2017 Indian Tamil-language coming-of-age romantic comedy film, written and directed by T. J. Gnanavel. The film stars Ashok Selvan and Priya Anand. Featuring music composed by Nivas Prasanna, This movie is produced by Dream Warrior Pictures and Ramaniyam Talkies. The film was released on 28 July 2017 with mixed reviews.

Plot 
Aravind is an average student who receives not much attention from his parents, teachers, and friends. During his school days, he sees Janani and develops a liking for her. Janani secures state rank in 12th board exams and aspires to become a journalist and joins a Journalism College. Aravind also manages to secure an admission in the same journalism college. Sathyamurthy is a local don and a kindhearted person. Yogendran, an inspector, seeks vengeance over Sathya and wants to kill him.

Aravind proposes to Janani in college, but she turns him down, saying that he needs to achieve something in life. Aravind feels disappointed and decides to end his life by drowning himself. He accidentally saves a child, who happens to be Sathya's son. Sathya thanks Aravind and promises to offer him any help if needed. Aravind reveals the truth to Sathya that his original intention was to kill himself. The video of Aravind saving Sathya's son goes viral in social media, and he receives recognition in college and from Janani. Slowly, Aravind and Janani become good friends. Also, Aravind scores well in an exam and secures a scholarship for a short trip to London School of Journalism. It is shown that Sathya is behind all these incidences. He found the video and made it viral and also threatened the college professor so that Aravind would secure his scholarship.

Aravind is in a dilemma whether to disclose the truth to Janani. Meanwhile, Yogendran tries to kill Sathyamurthy but gets escaped. In the process, Janani meets with an accident. However, Sathya later gets killed by Yogendran in another attempt. Janani soon finds out the truth that Sathya was behind Aravind helping him secure a scholarship, and she leaves Aravind. Aravind finds out that the truth was revealed to Janani by his classmate Sanjay, who found it with the help of the professor. Aravind decides to change his way of life. He starts an NGO supporting people in need of food, and manages it successfully. Janani's wedding is fixed with a man who happens to interview Aravind. Janani watches the video and understands Aravind's true nature. Finally, Aravind is united with Janani.

Cast

 Ashok Selvan as Arvind
 Priya Anand as Janani
 Samuthirakani as Sathyamurthy
 John Vijay as Yogendran
 Nassar as Gunaseelan
 G. Marimuthu as Arvind's father 
 Rama as Arvind's mother
 Anupama Kumar as Janani's mother
 Bagavathi Perumal as Teacher
 Bala Saravanan as Mano
 Sanjay Bharathi as Sanjay
 Nancy Jennifer as Ranjini
 Anisha Singh as Sheela

Guest appearance in promotional song
Sivakumar
Suriya
Arya
Sivakarthikeyan
Vijay Sethupathi
Vishnu Vishal
Prakash Raj
RJ Balaji
N. Linguswamy

Production
Gnanavel wrote the story inspired after meeting the late Thenkachi Ko Swaminathan, a famous orator. Initially director wrote the script with Nivin Pauly in mind for the role of protagonist, though he's interested in the script, due to non-availability of dates, the actor could not sign this project. When Ashok Selvan learned that debut director Gnanavel was looking for protagonist through the music director Nivas K prasanna, he himself expressed his interest to the director and then Ashok Selvan and Priya Anand were signed in this project in early 2015 to play the lead roles in this college love story.  Prior to this, director has written dialogues for Praksah Raj, Nagarjuna starring Payanam and Suriya's Raktha Charithiram. Pramodh is handling cinematography for this movie. The film began production during April 2015, most of the scenes were filmed at VIT University in Vellore. Award-winning actress Anupama Kumar joined the cast in a prominent role. Telugu actress Anisha Singh was signed for a role and this would be her debut in a Tamil film, while Bala Saravanan and Sanjay Bharathi were selected to portray friends/classmates of the lead pair. Nasser is also doing a role in this film. In the audio release event, Director Gnanavel said the film will be the story of ‘Middle-benchers’. "Many people who have made huge achievements in the world have been middle-benchers in the past. But we never care about middle-benchers. This film will deal with this irony." After the critically acclaimed super hit Joker and the mega budget horror flick Kaashmora, the next venture of the Dream Warrior Pictures production banner is Kootathil Oruthan.

Promotion 
The team has filmed a promotional song called Gift song, in which many leading actor from Tamil film industry were a part of it. This song portrays that hope and belief are very important and everyone in this world are a gift to themselves.

Release
Earlier, Dream Warrior Pictures, the production house of this movie has confirmed the theatrical release date as 14 July 2017. Due to the theatre owners strike to waive the state entertainment tax, the release of the film is postponed by the producers to 28 July 2017. The satellite rights of the film were sold to STAR Vijay. Baradwaj Rangan of Film Companion wrote "But the director, who also wrote the film, keeps veering off into subplots that sound fine in theory but don’t come together convincingly on screen. Had the events leading to this development been put in place much earlier, the film might have been more than just an easy watch."

Soundtrack

The soundtrack was composed by Nivas K. Prasanna and it was released on 29 November 2016.

References

External links
 Kootathil Oruthan Website Link
 

2017 films
2010s Tamil-language films
Indian coming-of-age comedy-drama films
Films scored by Nivas K. Prasanna
Indian romantic comedy-drama films
2017 directorial debut films
2010s coming-of-age comedy-drama films
2017 romantic comedy-drama films